Marek Židlický (born ) is a Czech former professional ice hockey player who played in the  National Hockey League (NHL). He was selected in the sixth round, 176th overall, by the New York Rangers in the 2001 NHL Entry Draft.

Playing career
Marek Židlický was selected 176th overall, in the sixth round of the 2001 NHL Entry Draft on June 24, 2001. He was selected as the sixth choice of the New York Rangers. Židlický had a very strong 2000–01 season with HIFK of the Finnish SM-liiga, ranking third on his team in assists (25) and tied for second on his team in points (37). He also led the league in points by a defenceman. This was enough for the Rangers to draft him in the NHL entry draft that next summer.

Židlický and the Rangers, however, could never agree to contract terms. The major sticking point was that Židlický wanted a one-way contract which would pay him the same amount of money regardless of whether he was playing in the NHL or the American Hockey League (AHL). He wanted this contract because he was worried about the depth of the Rangers and did not want to spend too much time in the minor leagues. The Rangers, however, would not agree to such a deal and only offered a two-way contract, one that would pay him at a lower rate if he played in the AHL. Because of these contract differences, Židlický opted to stay in Finland and continue playing for HIFK.

Židlický had two more very strong years for HIFK leading the team in points in 2001–02 with 40 points. The next season, he tied for the team lead in points with 47. Realizing that Židlický would not come to North America to play without a one-way contract and unwilling to give him one, the Rangers traded him, along with Rem Murray and Tomáš Klouček, for goaltender Mike Dunham on December 12, 2002, to the Nashville Predators.

Židlický joined the Predators in Nashville for the 2003–04 season, which proved to be a very successful season for Židlický. He recorded his first NHL point in his NHL debut on October 10, 2003, in a 3–1 win over the Mighty Ducks of Anaheim. He scored his first NHL goal the next day in the second period of a 3–1 loss to the Dallas Stars. He became the first Predator to play all 82 games in his first season in the league (he was not considered a rookie because of his age).

Židlický was injured when he was checked in the opening minutes of the first ever Predators playoff game against the Detroit Red Wings. He suffered a concussion and was unable to return for any more games in the playoff series. During the 2004–05 NHL lockout, Židlický returned to play for HIFK in Helsinki. On May 8, 2006, it was announced that the Predators and Židlický had agreed on terms for a new four-year contract worth $13.5 million.

On July 1, 2008, Židlický was traded to the Minnesota Wild for Ryan Jones and a second round draft pick in the 2009 NHL Entry Draft. During his second season with the Wild, Židlický was re-signed to a three-year contract extension on March 2, 2010.

On February 24, 2012, Židlický was traded to the New Jersey Devils from the Minnesota Wild in exchange for Kurtis Foster, Nick Palmieri, Stephane Veilleux, a Washington Capitals' second round draft pick in 2012 and a conditional pick in 2013. In July 2013, he was re-signed by the Devils. On June 3, 2014, Zidlicky was re-signed by the Devils to a one-year contract worth $3 million, plus $1 million with incentives.

On March 2, 2015, the Devils traded Židlický to the Detroit Red Wings for a conditional third-round pick in the 2016 NHL Draft. Initially, the Red Wings were nearing a trade with the Toronto Maple Leafs for captain Dion Phaneuf, however, the deal fell through at the last minute, forcing the Red Wings to look elsewhere for a defenceman. The Red Wings were in need of a veteran right-handed shot to fit in on their powerplay, and Židlický filled this quota almost immediately after arriving in Detroit. During his first game with the Red Wings on March 4, Židlický scored the game-winning overtime goal, in a 2–1 win over the New York Rangers.

On September 18, 2015, Židlický signed as a free agent to a one-year contract with the New York Islanders.

Records
Nashville Predators franchise record for assists in a game (5)
Nashville Predators franchise record for power play points in a season (35)

Career statistics

Regular season and playoffs

International

References

External links

1977 births
Czech ice hockey defencemen
Detroit Red Wings players
Rytíři Kladno players
HIFK (ice hockey) players
Ice hockey players at the 2006 Winter Olympics
Ice hockey players at the 2010 Winter Olympics
Living people
Medalists at the 2006 Winter Olympics
Minnesota Wild players
Nashville Predators players
New Jersey Devils players
New York Islanders players
New York Rangers draft picks
Olympic bronze medalists for the Czech Republic
Olympic ice hockey players of the Czech Republic
Olympic medalists in ice hockey
Sportspeople from Most (city)
Ice hockey players at the 2014 Winter Olympics
Czech expatriate ice hockey players in the United States
Czech expatriate ice hockey players in Finland